This is the complete list of Asian Games medalists in cue sports from 1998 to 2010.

Men

Three-cushion singles

Straight rail singles

English billiards singles

English billiards doubles

Eight-ball singles

Eight-ball doubles

Nine-ball singles

Nine-ball doubles

Snooker singles

Snooker doubles

Snooker team

Women

Eight-ball singles

Nine-ball singles

Six-red snooker singles

Six-red snooker team

References 
Sports123
1998 results and medalists

Cue sports
medalists